The 2019 Barcelona FIA Formula 3 round was a motor racing event held on 11 and 12 May 2019 at the Circuit de Barcelona-Catalunya in Spain. It was the first round of the 2019 FIA Formula 3 Championship, and ran in support of the 2019 Spanish Grand Prix.

Summary

Background
Following the 2018 GP3 Series, the series became the FIA Formula 3 Championship after merging with the FIA Formula 3 European Championship.

The round saw the début of the new Dallara F3 2019 chassis. The new chassis uses the same Mecachrome 3.4 litre (207 cu in) naturally-aspirated V6 engine that powered its predecessor, the GP3/16, but the power output is slightly reduced. The chassis also uses Pirelli tyres, as its predecessor GP3 did, and features the "halo" device used for cockpit protection.

Ten teams were listed to compete in the inaugural season; Reigning GP3 champions ART Grand Prix, Campos Racing, Jenzer Motorsport, MP Motorsport and Trident were chosen from the GP3 Series teams, while Carlin, Hitech Grand Prix, and reigning European F3 champions Prema Racing were chosen from the Formula 3 European Championship. Both Carlin and Prema Racing had entries in the championship's sister series Formula 2, as did Charouz Racing System, who later formed a partnership with former Formula 1 team Sauber. The final entry went to HWA Racelab, who joined the championship after Mercedes-Benz left the Deutsche Tourenwagen Masters touring car championship to focus on their Formula E entry.

Qualifying
Prema Racing's and Ferrari Driver Academy member Robert Shwartzman became the first pole sitter of the series, ahead of ART's Christian Lundgaard and Prema teammate Marcus Armstrong.

Feature Race
At the start, Christian Lundgaard took the lead into turn one from Robert Shwartzman, with Marcus Armstrong in third place. Lundgaard led for the entire race and became the first race winner of the new championship, with Shwartzman and fellow Ferrari junior Marcus Armstrong completing the podium in third, giving Prema a double podium finish. However, on the cool-down lap, Lundgaard would be awarded a penalty for exceeding the Full Course Yellow speed limit, which would hand the win to Russian driver Shwartzman.

The only retirement of the race was Campos Racing's Alessio Deledda, who spun off on lap 14 at turn 12. Liam Lawson would also not be classified following a late pit-lane start having suffered a mechanical failure on the warm-up lap.

Sprint Race
Niko Kari, who returned to the championship with Trident after racing for MP Motorsport in GP3 and Formula 2 in 2018, qualified in reverse grid pole after finishing eighth in the first race. He was immediately overtaken at the start by the third Prema driver Jehan Daruvala, who competed in both GP3 and European F3 in 2018. The start saw four drivers eliminated following a collision at turns 1 and 2; Raoul Hyman, Ye Yifei, Jake Hughes, and Artem Petrov, which brought out the safety car. On lap 9, Fabio Scherer made contact with Bent Viscaal at turn 2 and Simo Laaksonen and Alex Peroni collided at the same turn, putting an end to both the Charouz and MP Motorsport drivers' respectively.

As Lundgaard did in the first race, Daruvala led the entire race and brought home a victory for Prema, with Red Bull Junior Jüri Vips in second and Kari third for Trident. The result gave Prema a 32 point lead over ART in the teams' championship, and Robert Shwartzman a 13 point lead over Lundgaard in the drivers' championship.

Classification

Qualifying

Feature Race

 Driver awarded a five-second penalty for exceeding the VSC delta.

Sprint Race

Standings after the event

Drivers' Championship standings

Teams' Championship standings

 Note: Only the top five positions are included for both sets of standings.

See also
 2019 Spanish Grand Prix
 2019 Barcelona Formula 2 round

References

External links
 Official website

Barcelona
Formula 3
Auto races in Spain
Barcelona FIA Formula 3 round